is a major interchange railway station in Nishi-ku, Yokohama, Japan. It is the busiest station in Kanagawa Prefecture and the fifth-busiest in the world as of 2013, serving 760 million passengers a year.

Lines
Yokohama Station is served by the following lines:

East Japan Railway Company (JR East)
 Tokaido Main Line
 Yokosuka Line
 Yokohama Line
 Shōnan-Shinjuku Line
 Keihin-Tohoku Line
 Negishi Line
Keikyū
 Keikyū Main Line
Sagami Railway (Sotetsu)
 Sagami Railway Main Line
Tokyu Corporation
 Tokyu Toyoko Line 
Yokohama Minatomirai Railway
 Minatomirai Line 
Yokohama Municipal Subway

(JR Central's Tokaido Shinkansen passes through Shin-Yokohama Station, not Yokohama Station.)

Station layout

Keikyu and JR East
The JR East and Keikyū platforms are located in the main above-ground portion of Yokohama Station. Keikyū's section consists of platforms 1 to 2, JR East operates platforms 3 to 10.

Keikyū introduced station numbering to its stations on 21 October 2010; Yokohama Station was assigned station number KK37.

Tokyu and Minatomirai
Tokyu Corporation and the Yokohama Minatomirai Railway Company share the same underground station located in the 5th underground level of Yokohama Station, to the west of the JR platforms.

Yokohama Municipal Subway
The Yokohama Municipal Subway is located on the 3rd basement level, west of the main station.

Sotetsu
Sagami Railway is an above-ground structure to the west of the main station, connected to the Sotetsu Department Store.

Bus services

Expressway bus (daytime)
Yokohama City Air Terminal
For Haneda Airport
For Narita Airport
Eastside bus terminal
For Tokyo Disney Resort
For JR Gotemba Station (Mount Fuji), Hakone Tōgendai (Lake Ashi)

Expressway bus (overnight)
Yokohama City Air Terminal
For JR Nagoya Station, JR Okayama Station
Eastside bus terminal
For JR Kyoto Station, JR Ōsaka Station, JR Sendai Station, JR Akita Station

Local routes
Yokohama Municipal Bus
Sotetsu Bus
Kanachu Bus
Keikyū Bus

Surrounding area

The west and east have a complex underground business district which spans over several floors and is directly connected with the buildings which surround the station. Yokohama station has three bus terminals, and two other bus terminals are located near the station.

East entrance

Porta (underground shopping mall)
Sogo (department store, with Yokohama station eastside bus terminal)
Lumine (shopping building)
Kiyoken 
Marui (0101) (department store)
Yokohama Sky Building (with Yokohama City Air Terminal, and its bus terminal)
Bay Quarter Yokohama (shopping center)
Yokohama Plaza Hotel
Yokohama Central Post Office
The Port Service Yokohama Station East Exit pier

West entrance

The Diamond (underground shopping mall, and stairs to westside bus terminal)
Takashimaya (department store)
CIAL (shopping building : under construction)
Sotetsu Joinus (shopping building)
Sotetsu Movil 109 cinemas
Yokohama station westside second bus terminal
Yokohama Cinema Society
Yokohama Excel Hotel Tokyu (under construction)
Yokohama Bay Sheraton Hotel and Towers
Yokohama More's (shopping building, with Tokyu Hands Yokohama store)
Yodobashi Camera Yokohama store
Bic Camera Yokohama store
Vivre (shopping building)
Daiei (supermarket)
NTT Yokohama East Building

History

First station 

On 7 May 1872 (12 June in Gregorian calendar), Yokohama Station (original station, now Sakuragichō Station) opened as one of the first railway stations in Japan.

On 11 July 1887, the railway was extended from Yokohama to Kōzu Station. Through trains between Shimbashi Station and Kōzu Station required a switchback at Yokohama Station.
On 1 August 1898, a line bypassing Yokohama Station was opened to avoid the switchback. Through trains stopped at Kanagawa Station or Hodogaya Station instead of Yokohama Station, and shuttle trains connected Yokohama and Hodogaya until Hiranuma Station opened near present-day Hiranumabashi Station on 10 October 1901. Hiranuma Station had no connection to public transport such as trams, so that major part of the passengers for the city continued to use trains that stopped at Yokohama Station.

Second station 

On 15 August 1915, the second Yokohama Station opened close to the present day Takashimachō Station to allow Tōkaidō Main Line trains to call at Yokohama Station. The original Yokohama Station was renamed Sakuragichō Station. JR East uses this date as the opening date of the current Yokohama Station.
The terminal of the Keihin Line (present-day Keihin-Tōhoku Line) had been in Takashimachō since 1914 and was merged with the new station. The government-run electric line was later that year extended to Sakuragichō.

On 1 September 1923, the station was destroyed by a fire in the 1923 Great Kantō earthquake.
Six days later, the station reopened with a temporary building.
The city of Yokohama and the Ministry of Railways agreed in February 1924 that the station would be relocated.

On 18 May 1928, the Tokyo Yokohama Railway (now the Tokyu Toyoko Line) was extended from its former terminal at Kanagawa Station to the station. The extension line passed through the construction site of the new Yokohama Station of the government railways.

Third station  

On 15 October 1928, the third (current) Yokohama Station opened on the north side of the second station. The Tōkaidō Main Line also moved to its current route, which was the route of the bypass line opened in 1898. The government railways and the Toyoko Line shared the station from the beginning.
On 5 February 1930, the Keihin Electric Railway (now the Keikyu Main Line) was connected to the station.
On 27 December 1933, the Jinchū Railway (now the Sotetsu Main Line) was connected to the station. On 9 December 1957, the north side underground entrance opened. On 1 December 1965, the MARS on-line ticket reservation system was introduced at the station. On 4 September 1976, the Yokohama City Subway Line No. 3 was connected to Yokohama Station. On 7 November 1980, the new east station building and east-west passage opened. On 31 January 2004, The Tōkyū Tōyoko Line platform reopened underground, and on 1 February 2004, the Minatomirai Line opened.

2020 
It opened in 2020 before the Tokyo 2020 Summer Olympics. The development includes a 26-story retail and office building, on the site of the current West Entrance and a nine-story building to the north-east, which includes parking and childcare facilities.

Passenger statistics
In fiscal 2013, the JR East station was used by an average of 406,594 passengers daily (boarding passengers only), making it the busiest JR East station in Kanagawa Prefecture and the fourth-busiest on the JR East network as a whole.

The JR East passenger figures for previous years are as shown below.

See also
List of East Japan Railway Company stations

References

External links

 JR-East Yokohama Station information 
 Keikyu Railway Train and Bus information 
 Tokyu Railway information
 Yokohama Minatomirai railway information
 Sōtetsu Line Yokohama Station Map
 Transportation Bureau, City of Yokohama (Municipal Subway and Bus) 

Railway stations in Kanagawa Prefecture
Railway stations in Japan opened in 1872
Tōkaidō Main Line
Yokosuka Line
Keihin-Tōhoku Line
Negishi Line
Keikyū Main Line
Tokyu Toyoko Line
Minatomirai Line
Sagami Railway Main Line
Blue Line (Yokohama)
Stations of East Japan Railway Company
Stations of Keikyu
Stations of Tokyu Corporation
Stations of Yokohama Minatomirai Railway
Stations of Sagami Railway
Stations of Yokohama City Transportation Bureau
Railway stations in Yokohama
Railway stations in Japan opened in 1915